Koonam is a census village in Taliparamba Taluk in  North Kerala Division, Kannur District of Kerala, India. It comes under Kurumathoor and chengalayi Panchayaths.

Demographics
As of 2001 India census, Koonam had a population of 5000. Most of the residents speak Malayalam.

Politics
Koonam is traditionally a communist stronghold. But Indian National congress has strong influence in this Village. Koonam village falls under Taliparamba assembly constituency which is part of Kannur (Lok Sabha constituency).

How to reach there 
Koonam  is located about 3 km from State Highway 36 (Kerala).
and nearest National Highway 17 (India)(old numbering) access is at Taliparamba. It has been now renumbered as NH-66.
 Nearest city: Kannur - 
 Nearest airport: Kannur International Airport -

Biodiversity of Koonam Village

Koonam is a unique village by Nature well known for its diversity of grasslands.

The midland rocks of northern Kerala have its own characteristic floral composition supporting  hillock system in supporting a unique assemblage of species and cashew plantations.

Its unique by Nature surrounded by Rocky terrain, grasslands

Kurumathoor, chuzali, Chavanapuzha, Kalliasseri, Poomangalam, Panniyoor, Mazhur, Pappinisseri, are the nearby villages to Koonam. It is near to Arabian sea.

Large parcels of land has been under the Government of Kerala (occupied in 1970 as part of the Land reforms act), so in the coming years it is expected to see some developments.

Educational institutions
Schools
 Koonam LP School.
 Largest Industrial Training Institute (ITI)

Transportation
The national highway passes through Taliparamba town. Goa and Mumbai can be accessed on the northern side and Cochin and Thiruvananthapuram can be accessed on the southern side.  Taliparamba has a good bus station and buses are easily available to all parts of Kannur district.  The road to the east of Iritty connects to Mysore and Bangalore.  But buses to these cities are available only from Kannur, 22 km to the south. The nearest railway stations are Kannapuram  and Kannur on Mangalore-Palakkad line. 
Trains are available to almost all parts of India subject to advance booking over the internet.  There are airports at Kannur, Mangalore and Calicut. All of them are small international airports with direct flights available only to Middle Eastern countries.

Landmarks

 Nearest Temple :Koonam Ayyappan Temple which is the only temple in this village.
Nearest Mosque  :Koonam Badr Juma Maajid which the masjid in this village Koonam Mosque .
 Nearest Temple:  Poomangalam Someswari Temple -1.3 km
 Famous Playground :Angakalari Koonam play ground
 Famous Temple  :  Rajarajeshwara Temple -8 km
 Famous Temple  :  Trichambaram Temple -9 km
 Nearest Tourist places: Parassinikkadavu -10 km
Nanoos General merchant : one super market in koonam started in 1940

See also

Krishi Vigyan Kendra Kannur
National Institute of Fashion Technology
Government College of Engineering, Kannur
District Agricultural Farm, Taliparamba
Sir Syed College
Muthappan temple
Kunnathoor Padi
Udayagiri, Kannur
Kuppam Taliparamba

References

External links 

 Kannur District official website
 Kannur Airport

Tourism places in Kannur
 

Villages near Taliparamba